Joshua Seney (March 4, 1756 – October 20, 1798) was an American farmer and lawyer from Queen Anne's County, Maryland. He represented the state of Maryland in the Continental Congress, and the second district of Maryland in the House of Representatives.

Early life
Joshua was born to John Seney (1730–1795) and Ruth (née Benton) Seney in 1756 on the family farm near Church Hill in the Province of Maryland. His grandfather, Solomon, was a French Huguenot refugee who arrived in Maryland around 1727.  By the time Joshua was born the family were prosperous farmers and planters. He was educated in local schools and then attended the College of Philadelphia (now the University of Pennsylvania), graduating in 1773.

Career
After Seney was admitted to the bar, he confined himself to a private practice.  In 1779, he served as the High Sheriff of Queen Anne's County, Maryland.

Continental Congress
During the early days of the Revolutionary War Seney busied himself with the care of the family's farms since his father was active as a Lt. Colonel in the militia. He was appointed the sheriff of Queen Anne's County in 1779. He was elected to the Maryland state House of Delegates, and served there from 1785 to 1787. In 1788, Seney was sent as a delegate to the Continental Congress.

United States Congress
After returning to his farm, Seney was again called to political service when he was elected to the First United States Congress in 1789. He was re-elected for the 1791–1793 term as an Anti-Administration candidate but resigned from Congress on December 6, 1792 to take up his new duties as a judge of the state court for the district of Baltimore. He served as Chief Justice of the Third Judicial District of Maryland from 1792 to 1796.

In 1798, Seney ran for Congress again as a Republican. He defeated the incumbent Federalist, William Hindman but died before taking office.

Personal life
Seney was married to Frances "Fanny" Nicholson (1771–1851) of the prominent Nicholson family of Maryland.  Fanny was the daughter of Commodore James Nicholson and was the sister of Catherine "Kitty" Nicholson (wife of William Few), Hannah Nicholson (wife of Albert Gallatin), James Witter Nicholson (husband of Ann Griffin, daughter of Isaac Griffin), Maria Nicholson (wife of John Montgomery), and Jehoiadden Nicholson (wife of James Chrystie).  Together, Joshua and Fanny were the parents of:

 Joshua Seney Jr. (1793–1854), who married Ann Ebert (1803–1879), the parents of Judge Henry William Seney.

Seney died at home on October 20, 1798 and was buried in a family plot on his farm near Church Hill in Queen Anne's County.  His grave can now be found in the churchyard of St. Luke's Church.

References

External links
 
 

|-

1756 births
1798 deaths
18th-century American politicians
American lawyers admitted to the practice of law by reading law
Continental Congressmen from Maryland
Democratic-Republican Party members of the United States House of Representatives from Maryland
Elected officials who died without taking their seats
Farmers from Maryland
Maryland sheriffs
Members of the Maryland House of Delegates
People from Queen Anne's County, Maryland
University of Pennsylvania alumni